The Amateur Athletic Union Tournament is the annual American amateur basketball championship series for Amateur Athletic Union (AAU) teams. It started in 1897 and has continued until present. Most finals have been played in a single final format, apart from some occasions that the winner's tournament had been decided by a round robin format.

Later, professional players like David Robinson, Larry Brown, and Gregg Popovich were crowned champions of the AAU. Popovich and Robinson represented the U.S. Armed Forces All-Stars. Between 1920 and 1950, some of the strongest basketball teams in the United States were sponsored by corporations, including Phillips 66, 20th Century Fox, Safeway Inc., Caterpillar Inc., and others.

History
By the early 1930s, a few teams had earned reputations for basketball excellence and produced AAU All-Americans such as Forrest DeBernardi, Melvin Miller and Chuck Hyatt. In 1936 the significance of the tournament soared as it became integral part of the process to select US first Olympic team. When the stakes became higher, the competition between AAU and NCAA grew more intense as its organization asserted its claim to represent the US in international competition
But the AAU tournaments came to rise during the 1950s and 1960s with teams like the Phillips 66ers, the Peoria Caterpillars, the Akron Goodyears, the Denver D-C Truckers and the Wichita Vickers. These teams played a full schedule each season, topping 30 games a year and traveling throughout the country. Some of them  also helped introduce the American style of basketball to foreign players. In 1956, the Buchan Bakers played games in Japan, the Philippines, France, Italy, Czechoslovakia, Poland and Spain.
During the 1950s, the rosters of the top amateur teams were filled with former college stars, many of whom had been drafted by the NBA, which was still in its formative years. The amateur teams sometimes offered more money than the pro teams as well as the security of full-time employment. AAU basketball was particularly strong in the Midwest, Southwest and West Coast, where the NBA had not yet established a presence.  
The top teams also played in the National Industrial Basketball League, which began play in the 1947–48 season, two years before the establishment of the NBA. The NIBL had as many as eleven teams for the 1951–52 season and had nine teams during its next to last season in 1959–60. The Phillips 66ers won the NIBL title 11 of the leagues 14 years of existence.
But the goal for all these teams was winning the National AAU Tournament, held each year in Denver. The tournament field was determined by play in regional AAU tournaments, and included the top industrial teams, armed services teams, and often teams just put together for the tournament. Between 1943 and 1963, the Phillips 66ers won the tournament 10 times and the Peoria Caterpillars won five times. But there was always a chance for a surprise team to slip past the favorites. The Buchan Bakers, long shots at the outset of the tournament, won the national championship in 1956. Other one-time winners included the Oakland Bittners, led by Don Barksdale, in 1949 and Stewart Chevrolet, led by George Yardley, in 1951.
The appeal of AAU basketball began to decline in the early 1960s as the NBA gained prominence with such players as Bill Russell, Wilt Chamberlain, Elgin Baylor, Oscar Robertson and Jerry West. The NIBL folded in 1961, and with expansion of the NBA and the formation of the American Basketball Association in the late 1960s, the annual National AAU Tournament faded from prominence.

AAU Champions
1897  New York 23 Street YMCA (1) (Round Robin)                   
1898  not held
1899  New York Knickerbocker Athletic Club (1) (Round Robin)
1900  New York Knickerbocker Athletic Club (2) (Round Robin)
1901  Ravenwood YMCA (1) 
1902  not held
1903  not held
1904  Buffalo Germans (1) (Round Robin)
1905  Kansas City Athletic Club (1)
1910  National Guard Co. F
1911  not held
1912  not held
1913  Armour Square Cornells (1) (Round Robin)
1914  Armour Square Cornells (2)
1915  San Francisco Olympic Club (1)
1916  University of Utah Utes (1)
1917  Illinois Athletic Club (1) 
1918  not held due to World War I 
1919  Los Angeles Athletic Club (1)
1920  New York University Violets (1)
1921  Kansas City Athletic Club (2)
1922  Lowe and Campbell (1)
1923  Kansas City Athletic Club (3)
1924  Butler University Bulldogs (1)
1925  Washburn College Ichabods (1)
1926  Hillyard Chemical Shine Alls (1)
1927  Hillyard Chemical Shine Alls (2)
1928  Cook's Paint Boys (1)
1929  Cook's Paint Boys (2)
1930  Wichita Clothiers(1)
1931  Wichita Clothiers (2)
1932  Wichita Clothiers (3)
1933  Diamond DX Oilers (1)
1934  Diamond DX Oilers (2)
1935  South Kansas Stage Lines (1) 
1936  Globe Refiners (1) 
1937  Denver Safeway Stores (1) 
1938  Healey Motors (1) 
1939  Denver Nuggets (2) 
1940  Phillips 66ers (1) 
1941  20th Century Fox (1) 
1942  Denver American Legion (3) 
1943  Phillips 66ers (2)
1944  Phillips 66ers (3)
1945  Phillips 66ers (4)
1946  Phillips 66ers (5)
1947  Phillips 66ers (6)
1948  Phillips 66ers (7)
1949  Oakland Bittners (1)
1950  Phillips 66ers (8)
1951  Stewart Chevrolet (1)
1952  Peoria Caterpillars (1)
1953  Peoria Caterpillars (2)
1954  Peoria Caterpillars (3)
1955  Phillips 66ers (9)
1956  Buchan Bakers (1)
1957  U.S. Air Force All-Stars (1)
1958  Peoria Caterpillars (4) 
1959  Wichita Vickers  (1)
1960  Peoria Caterpillars (5)
1961  Cleveland Pipers (1)
1962  Phillips 66ers (10)
1963  Phillips 66ers (11) 
1964  Akron Goodyear Wingfoots (1)
1965  U.S. Armed Forces All-Stars (1)
1966  Ford Mustangs (1)
1967  Goodyear Wingfoots (2) 
1968  U.S. Armed Forces All-Stars (2)
1969  U.S. Armed Forces All-Stars (3)
1970  U.S. Armed Forces All-Stars (4)
1971  U.S. Armed Forces All-Stars (5)
1972  U.S. Armed Forces All-Stars (6)
1973  Marathon Oil (1)
1974  Jacksonville All-Stars (1)
1975  Capital Insulation (1)
1976  Athletes in Action (1) 
1977  U.S. Armed Forces All-Stars (7)
1978  Joliet Christian Youth Center (1)
1979  Joliet Christian Youth Center (2)
1980  Airliner Basketball Club (1)
1981  Brewster-Heights Packing (1)
1982  Brewster-Heights Packing (2) 
1983  Houston Flyers (1)
1984  Paul-Son Dice (1)
1985  Brewster-Heights Packing (3)
1986  Continental/Coors (1)
1987  Brewster-Heights Packing (4)
1988  Brewster-Heights Packing (5)
1989  U.S. Armed Forces All-Stars (8) 
1990  Sam Ragnone Attorney (1) 
1991  Lafayette Hustlers (1) 
1992  Sam Ragnone Attorney (2)
1993  USA Verich Reps (1)
1994  MNS Stars (1)
1999  Palmer's Tornadoes (1) 
2000  Palmer's Tornadoes (2)
2005  The New Beginnings B.C. (1)

Finals

Total titles by club

List of AAU records

Venues and Winning squads

1897-1920: The beginnings
1898-1900 at New York
1898, Madison Square Garden, New York City: 23rd St. Y.M.C.A New York (later known as the New York Wanderers)
A.J. Abadie, A.C. Abadie, A. Shields, W. Reed, J. Hamill, Deitrich, Meyerhoff, J. Wendelken, G.
Greif. 
1899, Brooklyn, NYC: Knickerbocker A.C. New York 
Weiss, Stripple, Cornish, Keawn, Dietrich, Reuss.
1900, Madison Square Garden, New York City: Knickerbocker A.C. New York 
Quigg, Stripple, Brocker, Keawn, Linder, Reuss, Grennhall, Patterson.
1901: at Chicago
1901, at Chicago, Illinois: Ravenswood Y.M.C.A. Chicago, Illinois
Lorentzen, Rechard, Washburne, Albertson, Rowley, Stevens, Krafthefer.

1904: St. Louis Olympic Basketball Tournament
1904: Francis Field, St. Louis, Missouri: Buffalo (Germans) Y.M.C.A. Buffalo, New York - at St. Louis, Missouri
Rhode, Manweiler, Monohan, Hardt, Miller, Redlein.
1910-1914: at Chicago
1910, Chicago, Illinois: Commpany F. Portage, Wisconsin, N.F.
Sheppard, Mueller, Ebert, Janda, Hinickle, S. Ernsperger, Swenholt, Harbor, Abell, F. Ernsperger,
Schneider.
1913, Chicago, Illinois: Cornell (Armour Playground), Chicago, Illinois
A. Pressler, W. Pressler, Feeney, Johnson, Freeling, Kohfeldt.
1914, Chicago, Illinois: Cornell (Armour Playground), Chicago, Illinois
1915: at San Francisco
1915, San Francisco, California: Olympic Club of San Francisco, San Francisco, CaliforniaBerndt, J. Gilbert, R Gilbert, Stadfeldt, Schugert, Miller, Kemp.
1916 and 1917: at Chicago
1916, Chicago, Illinois: University of Utah, Salt Lake City, Utah
Dorton, Warner, Thorum, Smith, Breiben, Romney, Van Pelt, Clark, Parker, Goodrich.
1917, Chicago, Illinois: Illinois A.C. Chicago, Illinois 
Kohfeldt, Elliot, D. Holland, Greisel, Cochrane, Feeney, A. Pressler (Capt), Frieling, W. Pressler,
Egan.
1919: at Los Angeles
1919, Los Angeles, California: Los Angeles A.C. Los Angeles, California 
Swann, Wilson, Laswell, Cooper, Slaighter (Capt.), Cate, Tate, Olney.
1920: at Atlanta
1920, Atlanta, Georgia: New York University 
Holman, Goeller, Delaney, Cann, Storey (Capt.), Mooney, Baker.

1921-1935: Kansas City venue
1921, Convention Hall, Kansas City: Kansas City, A.C.
Burrien, Saunders, Lonborg, Moberley, Singer, Davis, De Bernardi.
1922, Convention Hall, Kansas City: Lowe and Campbell, Kansas City
Browning, G. Williams, F. Williams, Reeves, Scott, Keyes, Buckner, Davidson.
1923, Convention Hall, Kansas City: Kansas City, A.C.
Williams, Trumbo, Harry Viner, Bobby Sanders, Francis Hess, George Reeves, George Williams,
Milton Singer, George Browning.
1924, Convention Hall, Kansas City: Butler University of Indianapolis, Indianapolis, Indiana
Paul, Blessing, Strole, Conway, Reichel, Griggs, Keach, Jones, Middlesworth (Capt.), Hooker,
Nipper, Harber.
1925, Convention Hall, Kansas City: Washburn College, Topeka, Kansas
Brewster, Peterson, Briethaupt (Capt), Lowe, Lonborg, Poart, McLaughlin, Spohn.
1926, Convention Hall, Kansas City: Hillyard, St, Joseph, Missouri
Earl Mueller, R. Hillyard D. Goodson, N Hillyard, C. Allen, George Rody, S. De Bernardi, G.
Starbuck, John Wulf, R. Mosley, E. Giltner.
1927, Convention Hall, Kansas City: Hillyard, St Joseph, Missouri
Starbuck, Loveless, Wulf, Allen, De Bernardi, Mitchel, Hewitt.
1928, Convention Hall, Kansas City: Cook Paint Company, Kansas City
Holt, Peterson, Ekstrom, Gordon, Mosley (Capt.), Lecrone, Wingate, DeBernardi.
1929, Convention Hall, Kansas City: Cook Paint Company, Kansas City
De Bernadi, Burke, Hewitt, Peterson, Holt, Harrigan, Hale, Gordon, Lamb.
1930, Convention Hall, Kansas City: Henry Clothiers, Wichita, Kansas
McBurney, Starbock, Gibbons, Hewitt, Miller, Davis, Dundham, Nonken, Burke.
1931, Convention Hall, Kansas City: Henry Clothiers, Wichita, Kansas
Davis, Callahan, Dunham, Scott, Miller, Iba, McBurney, Hoffman, Alexander, Gardner (Capt).
1932, Convention Hall, Kansas City: Henry Clothiers, Wichita, Kansas
Miller, Gibbons, Grove, Pickell, Olmstead, Dunham, Calahan.
1933, Convention Hall, Kansas City: Diamond DX Oilers, Tulsa, Oklahoma
Chuck Hyatt, Futhey, Jerome, C. Larson, Lantrop, Carlton, H. Larson, Mullins, Art Hyatt.
1934, Convention Hall, Kansas City: Diamond DX Oilers, Tulsa, Oklahoma 
W. Miller, Willis, Lantrop, Carlton (Capt), Larson, Pickell, Mullins, Hyatt.
1935, Convention Hall, Kansas City: Southern Kansas Stage Lines
Fischer, Browning, Piper, Quinn, Wier, Wallenstrom, Praiswater, Meyers, Light.
1936, Convention Hall, Kansas City: Globe Refiners, McPherson, Kansas 
Johnson, Ragland, Frank, Gibbons, Wheatley, Vaughan, Dowd, Fortenbury, Schmidt.

1937-1956: Denver Rise
1937, Denver Auditorium Arena, Denver, Colorado: Denver Safeways, Denver, Colorado - 
Shelton (Capt). Mansweller, Frank, Young, Gruenig, Colvin, Dowell, McCracken, Bauer, Fee.
1938, Denver Auditorium Arena, Denver, Colorado: Healey Motors, Kansas City 
Herman Fischer, Francis Johnson, Bud Beiser, Roy Brown, Fred Pralle, Ray Noble, Dick Staab,
Frank Groves, Bob Weir.
1939, Denver Auditorium Arena, Denver, Colorado: Denver Nuggets, Denver, Colorado
Bill Ogle, Pete Lentry, Bob Gruenig, Dick Wells, Ted Connelly, Werner Frank, Ralph Bishop, Jack
McCracken, Tex Colvin.
1940, Denver Auditorium Arena, Denver, Colorado: Phillips 66, Bartlesville, Oklahoma 
1941, Denver Auditorium Arena, Denver, Colorado: Twentieth Century Foz, Hollywood, Carlifornia 
Cloyd, Woodward, Weldie, Johnson, Harris, O'Hara, Knowels, Lubin, McGrath, Mollner,
Schiefer.
Tucker, Pralle, Ebling, Loackard, Martin Hyatt (Amateur Coach), Lewis, Fortenbury, Trowtwein,
Grove, Shields.
1942, Denver Auditorium Arena, Denver, Colorado: American Legion, Denver, Colorado
Strannigan, Harvey, McCracken, Marsh, Marks, Gray, Unger, Lentz, Bob Gruenig.
1943, Denver Auditorium Arena, Denver, Colorado: Phillips 66, Bartlesville, Oklahoma
McNatt, Browning, Freiberger, Pralle, Carpenter, Rothman, Nash, Yates.
1944, Denver Auditorium Arena, Denver, Colorado: Phillips, 66, Bartlesville, Oklahoma McNatt, Browning, Tucker, Carpenter, Freiberger, Clar, Pralle, Rothman.
1949, Denver Auditorium Arena, Denver, Colorado: Oakland Bittners
Reimke, Williams, Voss, O'Gara, Barksdale, Fisher, Hanger, Fasholz, Silver, Minor.
1948, Denver Auditorium Arena, Denver, Colorado: Phillips 66, Bartlesville, Oklahoma
Beck, Nash, Reneck, Reich, Bob Kurland, Tucker, Carpenter, Beisser, Pitts, Jones.
1947, Denver Auditorium Arena, Denver, Colorado: Phillips 66, Bartlesville, Oklahoma
Carpenter, Martin, Stockman, Nash, Eggleston, Perrault, Reneck, Bob Kurland.
1946', Denver Auditorium Arena, Denver, Colorado: Phillips 66, Bartlesville, Oklahoma
Mcnatt, Nash, Carpenter, Martin, Renick, Rothman, Lewis, Reisser.
1945, Denver Auditorium Arena, Denver, Colorado: Phillips 66, Bartlesville, Oklahoma
Nash, Rothman, McNatt, Browning, Linderman, Halbert, Carpenter, Yates, Schwartzer.
1954, Denver Auditorium Arena, Denver, Colorado: Peoria Cats
Retherford, Minter, McCabe, Ron Bontemps, Gladson, Penwell, Sheets, Solomon.
1953, Denver Auditorium Arena, Denver, Colorado: Peoria Cats
Ron Bontemps, Freiberger, McCabe, Pippin, Williams, Retherford, Minter, Penwell, Dean, Haarlow.
1952, Denver Auditorium Arena, Denver, Colorado: Peoria Caterpillar Diesels
Ron Bontemps, Freiberger, McCabe, Pippin, Williams, Lafferty, Schmidt, Dempsey.
1951, Denver Auditorium Arena, Denver, Colorado: Stewart Chevrolet, San Francisco, California
Walker, Yardley, Hendricksen, Crandall, Kuzara, Payne, Greenback, Laney, Bullwinkel.
1950, Denver Auditorium Arena, Denver, Colorado: Phillips 66, Bartlesville, Oklahoma
Beck, Lipscomb, Bennett, Stanich, Courtney, Bob Kurland, Williams, Tucker, Reich, Pryor.

1957-1968: Denver Fall
1955, Denver Auditorium Arena, Denver, Colorado: Phillips 66, Bartlesville, Oklahoma
Walsh, Short, Darling, Ford, Houghland, Fuller, Mattick, Buchanan, Rivers.
1956, Denver Auditorium Arena, Denver, Colorado: Buchan Bakers, Seattle, Washington
Parsons, Halberg, Jordan, Swyers, Glowaski, Guisness, B. H. Born, Cipriano, Koon.
1957, Denver Auditorium Arena, Denver, Colorado: U.S. Air Force 
Boushka, Bragg, Warren, Tomsic, Welsh, Coshow, Kelley, White.
1958, Denver Auditorium Arena, Denver, Colorado: Peoria Cats 
Bingham, Palmer, B. H. Born, Prudhoe, Plunkett, Schultz, Sullivan, Warden, Lee, Wolfe, A. Kelley,
Crittenden, D. Kelley.
1959, Denver Auditorium Arena, Denver, Colorado: Wichita Vickers
Broushka, Swartz, Boldebuck, Lane, Revon, Smith, King, Schramm, Mullen.
1960, Denver Auditorium Arena, Denver, Colorado: Peoria Cats
Boozer, Adams, Prudhoe, Ohi, Crittenden, Plunkett, Kelley, Hill, Woll.
1961, Denver Auditorium Arena, Denver, Colorado: Cleveland Pipers, Cleveland
Adams, Swartz, Sharrar, Taylor, Barnhill, McCollom, Hamilton.
1962, Denver Auditorium Arena, Denver, Colorado: Phillips 66
Hagan, Robitallie, Frank, McNeil, Kojis, Thompson, Altenberg, Cole, Bowerman, Jerry Shipp, Price.
1963, Denver Auditorium Arena, Denver, Colorado: Phillips 66
Kojis, Jerry Shipp, Hagan, Price, Rascoe, Bowerman, Moran, Frank, Mounts, Pursiful.
1964, Denver Auditorium Arena, Denver, Colorado: Goodyear Wingfoots
Arnold, Beckman, Larry Brown (MVP), Davies, McCaffrey, McCoy, Sharrar, Small, Whiteford,
Williams.
1965, Denver Auditorium Arena, Denver, Colorado: Armed Forces All Stars
Sheehan, Meyers, Birkle, Reloff, Connelly, USMC; Fowler, Mahonak, Reid, Vern Benson (MVP), USA;
Stowers, USAF; Moor, USN.
1966, Denver Auditorium Arena, Denver, Colorado: Ford Mustangs
Russell (MVP), Clawson, Johnson, Olson, Darden, Curtis, Murrey, Thompson, Tregoning,
Washington.
1967, Denver Auditorium Arena, Denver, Colorado: Akron Goodyear
Miller, Jim King, Anderson, Calvin Fowler, Vern Benson, Patterson, McCoy, Corell, Dabich, Hanson.
1968, Denver Auditorium Arena, Denver, Colorado: Armed Forces All Stars
Coach Hal Fisher, USA; S/Sgt. Jones, Manager, USAF: Darius Cunningham, John Clawson,
George Carter, Mike Silliman, USA; Mike Redd, Marvin Willet, USMC; John Snipes, James Cole,
USN; Mike Barrett (MVP), USN; Ken Bradley, Harry Gilmore, Bill Blair, USAF.

1969-1970: at Macon and Columbia
1969, Macon, Georgia: Armed Forces All Stars
Coach Hal Fisher, USA; Garfield Smith, Ken Washington, Rod McDonald, Mike Silliman, George
Collier, Tal Brody, Harold Jeter, Bob Wolf, USA; Howard Hansen, USN; Mike Redd, Jim Meyers,
USMC.
1970, Columbia, South Carolina: Armed Forces All Stars
Coach Hal Fisher, USA; Mike Redd, USMC; Mike Sillman, Garfield Smith, Tal Brody, Mike Wolf,
Rod MacDonald, Ken Washington, Art Wilmore, Darnell Hillman, USA; Ed Whitehead, USAF.

1971-1973: at Kentucky
1971, London Kentucky: Armed Forces All Stars
Art Wilmore, Don Crenshaw, Bruce Sloan, Darnell Hillman, Jim Oxley, Fram Dumphy, Ron
Krayl, Larry Bauer, USA; Chuck Kozak, USMC; Cliff Parsons, USAF; Hal Fisher, Coach, USA,
Assistant Mike Krzyzewski, Jim Fox, USA.
1972, London Kentucky: Armed Forces All Stars
Bernie Barnes, Howard Hughes, Cliff Parsons, Ron Richards, Marv Schmitt, Gregg Popovich,
USAF; Bill Squires, USMC; Paul Andrews, Don Crenshaw, Tom Daley, USA.
1973, Ashland, Kentucky: Marathon Oil, Lexington, Kentucky 
Coaches ScottBaesler, Pat Doyle; Kenny Davis, Jim Lemaster, George Bryant, John Adams, Gene
Kirk, Jim Day, Dan Argabright, Ketchel Strauss, Phil Argento, Darryl Dunagan.

1974-1976: AAU Fall
1974-1976: at Baton Rouge
1974, F. G. Clark Center, Baton Rouge, Louisiana: Jacksonville, Florida
Coach Lowell Wood; Dan Foster, Rick Coleman, Chip Dublin, Otis Cole, Todd Lolich, Otis
Johnson, Lawrence McCray, Abe Steward, Rex Morgan.
1975, F. G. Clark Center, Baton Rouge, Louisiana: Capital Insulation, Los Angeles, California
Louis Smith, Dwight Taylor, Paul Scranton, Larry Hollifield, Billy Jackson, Carl Toney, Richard
Darnall, Hugh Fenderson, William Jankans, Robert Murray.
1976, F. G. Clark Center, Baton Rouge, Louisiana: Athletes in Action, Tustin, California - at 
Charles Neal, Brad Hoffman, Eldon Lawyer, Randy Allen, David Lower, Doug Oxsen, Irvin
Kiffin, Tim Hall, Dan Knight, John Sears.

1985-1998: at Topeka, Kansas
1985, Topeka, Kansas: Brewster Heights Packing, Brewster, Washington 
Coach John J. Pariseau, Assistant Coach Keith Kingsbury, Sponsor Ed Pariseau, Managers, Mike
Pariseau, Mark Pariseau; Eddie Smith, Pete Williams, Brian Kellerman, Jay Triano, John W.
Pariseau, Eli Pasquale, Phil Zevenbergen, Mike Terpstra, Eric Brewe, Ray Brooks. 
1986, Topeka, Kansas: Continental/Coors, Houston, Texas
Coach Marty Bratton; Jimmy Gilbert, Greg Anderson, Nick Cucinella, Ron Baxter, Andrew
Parker, Ernest Patterson, Alvin Franklin, Kevin Fitchett, Vick Ewing, Steve Sylestine, Harry
O'Brian, Greg Skulman.
1987, Topeka, Kansas: Brewster Heights Packing, Brewster, Washington
Coach John J. Pariseau, Assistant Coach Keith Kingsbury, Sponsor Ed Pariseau; John W. Pariseau,
Alvin Vaughn, Lorenzo Romar, Jay Triano, Zack Jones, Todd Burton, Phil Zevenbergen, Tom
Gneiting, Eddie Smith, Sven Meyers, Ron Vanderschaaf.
1988, Topeka, Kansas: Brewster Heights Packing, Brewster, Washington
Coach John J. Pariseau, Assistant Coach Keith Kingsbury, Sponsor Ed Pariseau; John W. Pariseau,
Brian Kellerman, Lorenzo Romar, Phil Hopson, Jay Triano, Dan Weiss, Ricky Brown, Zak Jones,
Al Kristmanson, Kevin Sprewer. 
1989, Topeka, Kansas: US Armed Forces - at Topeka, Kansas
Coaches Harold Johnson and Bill Carry; Earl Wilson, Kevin Houston, Timothy Wilson, Samural
Addison, Kevin Bradshaw, Dion Brown, Raymond Lettstom, K.E. Whittaker, Walter Golden,
Willie Linder, Charles Bailey, David Robinson.
1990, Topeka, Kansas: Sam Ragnone, Attorney - Flint, Michigan - at Topeka, Kansas
Coach Sam Ragnone; Joel Ragland, Lamar Edwards, Darrin Fitzgerald, Tom Hawkins, Terry
Duerod, Eric Turner, Ray Keiser, Greg Kelser, Lorenzo Orr, Zack Hicks, Rony Thompkins, Ernest
Williams.
1991, Topeka, Kansas: Lafayette Hustlers - Lafayette, Indiana
Coach Jim Bower, Ryan Berning, Ricky Hall, Derrick Johnson, Kip Jones, Walter Jordan, John Teague, Shawn Teague, Chad Tucker, Tim Hasley, T. Cutter.
1992, Topeka, Kansas: Sam Ragnone Attorney - Flint, Michigan
Coach Sam Ragnone, Darrin Fitzgerald, Lamar Edwards, Eric Turner, Terry Duerod (MVP), Gilvannie
Johnson, Jones, Phil Hubbard, Greg Kelser.
1993, Topeka, Kansas: USA Verich Reps - Warren, Ohio 
Coach Louis Cathcart, Derrick Fields, Mergin Sina, Darrin Morningstar, Bill Edwards, Johnny
McDole, Louis Geter, Trig Lee, Dapris Owens, Harris, Craig, Hodges.
1994, Topeka, Kansas: MNS Stars - Kansas City, Missouri 
Coach Milton R. Bradley, Nate Buntin, Stan Bradley, Aaron Collier, Michael Irvin, Will Scott,
Jamal Coleman, Deryl Kearney, Deryl Conningham, Stan Bradley, Jay Boster, Cody, Waters.
1995, Topeka, Kansas: Team Pella - Des Moines, Iowa 
Michael Born, Ron Bayless, Brad Pippett, Howard Eaton, Sam Powell, Fred Brown, Paul
Doerrfeld.
1996, Topeka, Kansas: Bankers and Investors-Kansas City, Missouri
Coach Riley Maher, Burce Chubick, Eugene Cheadle, Rick Muller, Brian Maher, Dion Barnes,
Tom Wald, Ralph Davis, Mac Irvin, Terrance Badgett, Erwin Claggett, Chris Haynes.
1997, Topeka, Kansas: Marathon Basketball - Joliette, Illinois
Coach Mark Simpson, Curt Smith, Erwin Claggett, Willie Murdaugh, Jerald Ryner, Jeff Harris,
Steve Showalter, Rick Hughes, Mikki Moore.
1998, Topeka, Kansas: Pella Windows - Des Moines, IA
Coach Michael J. Born, Michael Born, Ron Bayless, Carl Pickett, Brad Pippett, Troy Wade, Tony
Harvey, Jeff Hrubes.

1977, Lake Worth, Florida: Armed Forces All Stars 
Coach Hal Fisher, Assistant Wilbert Logan; Jyrona Ralston, Robert Sherwin, Eddie Brown, Pierre
Russell, James Penn, George Hester, Jerome Benning, Ron Brown, Bobby Young, Richard
McGuire, Alfred Forney, L.C. Pierce.
1978, at London, Kentucky: Christian Youth Center, Joliet Illinois 
Coach Glen Sergent; Tim Bryant, Dennis Taylor, Steve Clum, Jim Bocinski, Huby Marshall, Jim
Calhoun, Frank Kaminsky, Houston Lloyd, Bill Glover.
1979, Ponca City, Oklahoma: Christian Youth Center, Joliet, Illinois 
Coach Glen Sergent; Allan Hardy (MVP), Dennis Taylor, Steve Clum, Jim Bocinski, Huby
Marshall, Kerry Hughes, Frank Kaminsky, Craig Burtyn, Bill Glover.

1979 and 1980: at Florida
1980, St. Augustine, Florida: Airliner Basketball Club, Iowa City, Iowa
Coach Jim Baker, Assistant Dante Vignaroli, Sponsor Doug Tvedt; Fred Haberecht, Mike Gatens,
Neil Fegebank, Glenn Vicnovic, William Mayfield, Clay Hargrave, Rick Engel, Pete Griffin, Tom
Norma, Dick Peth, John Hairston, Gary DeCarlo.
1981, St. Agustine, Florida: Brewster-Heights Packing, Brewster, Washington 
Coach John J. Pariseau, Assistant Keith Kingsbury, Sponsor Ed Pariseau; Joe Leonard, Mark Scott,
Marion Pericin, Tony Barnes, Stan Walker, Todd Burton, Dennis Johnson, Jeff Stoutt, Wayne
Smith, Joe Webb.

1982, Portland Oregon: Brewster Heights Packing, Brewster, Washington 
Coach John J. Pariseau, Assistant Keith Kingsbury, Sponsor Ed Pariseau; Joe Webb, Eric Brewe,
Gene Glenn, Dan Caldwell, Todd Burton, Joe Leonard, Steve Matzen, Rob Visser, Ray Orange,
Billy Turney Loos, John Greig, John W. Pariseau.
1983, Ponca City, Oklahoma: Houston Flyers, Houston, Texas
Coach Marty Bratton, Assistant Howard Knight, John Flewellen; Latrell Mitchell, Harry O'Brien,
Steve Sylestine, Ed Jeffries, Andrew Parker, Ricky Hooker, Randy Martel, Hiram Harrison, David
Marrs, Larry Hendrix, Kenny Austin. 
1984, Las Vegas, Nevada: Paul-Son Dice, Las Vegas, Nevada
Coach Larry Keever, Manager Mike Pilz, Sponsor Paul-Son Dice and Card, Inc; Terry Manghum,
Alan Holder, Melvin Washington, Bobby Joe Jacobs, Cris Jackson, Armon Gilliam, Mel Bennet,
Keith Star, Greg Goorjian, Kenny Harmon, Sam Smith.

1999-present
1999-2000 at Des Moines
1999, Sisam Arena, Des Moines, Iowa: Palmer's Tornadoes, Des Moines, IA 
Coach David Palmer, Sam Crawford, David Palmer, Tim Gill, Lamar Hillsman, Darrel "A.J."
Waley, Stan Gouard, Rocky Walls, Wayne Houston, Ed Johnson, Ray Poindexter.
2000, Sisam Arena, Des Moines, Iowa: Palmer's Tornadoes – Des Moines, IA
Coach Stan Gouard, Asst. Coach David Palmer, Wayne Houston (MVP), Kevin Sams, Justin Wimmer, Tim Gill, Lonnie Cooper, Tyrone Barksdale, D. Taylor, Carl Pickett, Ed Johnson, M. Stephany.
2001-2005 at Sacramento
2001, Cosumnes River College, Sacramento, CA: Shell-Widman – Elk Grove, CACoach David Shell, Shann Ferch (MVP), Charles Terrell, Ali Thomas, Robert Richardson, Lossie Mitchell, Thomas Washington, Justin Leslie, Jason Cox, Rich Manning, Tito Addison, Jimmie
Carol.
2002, Cosumnes River College, Sacramento, CA: Posse – San Jose, CA – at Sacramento, California
Coach Joe Molina, Asst. Coach Al Gordon, Brian Jones (MVP), Wayman Strickland, Champ Wrencher, Darrel Teat, Dave Smith, Chris Samdahl, Steve Ross, Richard Morton, Julius Hicks, Brian Gomez.
2003, Cosumnes River College, Sacramento, CA: Sunny's Rebels – Seattle, WA
Coach Sunny Backlund, Antuan Jones (MVP), Jackie Jones, Chuck Johnson, Donald Watts, Brian
Dennis, Darnell Taylor, Chris Walcott
2004, Cosumnes River College, Sacramento, CA: Maine Lobsters, Bangor, Maine
Coach Charlie Wilson, Fred Hooks (MVP), Demarius Akins, Moses Alvarez, Ed Fontaine,
William Genung, Shaun Jackson, Fred Nichols, Rico Redd, TK Reed, Alton "Sonny" Smith,
Shannon Taylor, Al Williams
2005, Cosumnes River College, Sacramento, CA: Mitchell-McKineyz "New Beginnings 4 Youth," Columbus, Ohio
Coach Tony Rice, Tony Rice (MVP), Larry Abney, Ben Berry, Tony Givens, Isaac Jefferson, John
Spain, Orenthall Strothers, Shannon Swillis, Chad Younger.
2007: NA
2006: NA
2008, Cocoa Beach, Florida: 102 Jamz, Orlando, Florida
Brian S, Mike S, Mike E (MVP), Jason, Shawn S, T’here, Pete, Dave
2009, Reno, Nevada: Gold Rush, San Francisco, CA 
Coach, Rick Lewis: Jovan Harris (MVP), Cardell butler, Xavier McNally, Dean Browne, John
Tofi, Johnny Dukes, Reggie Smith, Larry Reggie.

MVP award

Notable teams
 Phillips 66ers
 Akron Wingfoots
 Denver Nuggets
 Peoria Cats
 US Armed Forces All-Stars 
 Buchan Bakers
 Cleveland Pipers
 Kansas City Athletic Club
 Oakland Bittners

AAU players who became NBA All-Stars
 Dick Barnett (Cleveland Pipers)
 Bob Boozer (Peoria Caterpillars)
 Vince Boryla (Denver Nuggets)
 Richie Guerin (Quantico Marines)
 Don Kojis (Phillips 66ers)
 Clyde Lee (Knoxville Contac Caps)
 Clyde Lovellette (Phillips 66ers)
 Tom Meschery (San Francisco Olympic Club)
 Don Ohl (Peoria Cats)
 Jim Pollard (San Diego Dons, Oakland Bittners)
 Flynn Robinson (Denver Capital)
 Bob Rule (Denver Capital)
 Cazzie Russell (Detroit Ford Mustangs)
 Ken Sears (San Francisco Olympic Club)
 George Yardley (San Francisco Stewart Chevrolets, Los Alamitos Naval Air Station)

Trial Games
The AAU also sent teams to the Olympic Trial Games organized before each Olympic tournament. The results of the teams would finally decide the players would play for the USA Team in the Olympics. The playoffs had a massive interest drawing huge crowds to the hosting venues. 
Similar games were organized for the FIBA World Cups.

Olympic Trials
1936: Universal Pictures - McPherson Globe Refiners 44-43 
1948: Phillips 66ers - Kentucky Wildcats 53-49 
1952: Peoria Caterpillars - Kansas University Jayhawks 62-60 
1956: Phillips 66ers

Pan American Games Trial
1959: NCAA All-Stars (3–0) - Phillips 66ers (2–1)

Pan-American Exposition
1901: Buffalo Germans

FIBA World Cup Trial
1950: Denver Chevrolets
1954: Peoria Caterpillars

References

Amateur Athletic Union